Bon Zard may refer to:
 Bon Zard, Fars
 Bon Zard, Kerman
 Bon Zard-e Olya, Kohgiluyeh and Boyer-Ahmad Province
 Bon Zard-e Sofla, Kohgiluyeh and Boyer-Ahmad Province